Peter Rubtzoff (February 14, 1920 – 1995) was a Russian botanist and entomologist. He specialized in the study of wetlands and aquatic plants. He was an authority on plants in Sonoma County.

Biography
Rubtzoff was born in Leningrad on February 14, 1920. He attended gymnasium in Riga, Latvia.

After becoming a refugee in the wake of World War II, he studied botany and zoology at the University of Innsbruck in Austria. He worked under botanist Helmut Gams.

Rubtzoff immigrated to the United States in 1949, and subsequently attended the University of San Francisco. In 1953, he earned an additional degree in biology and a M.Sc. in botany. He later became a field associate at the California Academy of Sciences and worked closely with John Thomas Howell.

Rubtzoff, Howell, and Peter Raven co-authored the 1958 A Flora of San Francisco, California, considered a thorough publication.

Rubtzoff was later employed by the Department of Entomology at the University of California, Berkeley from 1972 to 1988. He made important contributions to The Jepson Manual, specifically about species of rush.

He died in 1995.

References

Russian botanists
Russian entomologists
1920 births
1995 deaths
University of California, Berkeley faculty
University of San Francisco alumni